Afriz Rural District is a rural district (dehestan) in Sedeh District, Qaen County, South Khorasan Province, Iran. At the 2006 census, its population was 5,765, in 1,479 families.  The rural district has 14 villages.

References 

Rural Districts of South Khorasan Province
Qaen County